Jiandi railway station is a station of Beijing–Baotou railway in Inner Mongolia.

See also
 List of stations on Jingbao railway

Railway stations in Inner Mongolia